The 2017–18 Polish Cup was the 61st edition of the Polish Volleyball Cup tournament.

Trefl Gdańsk beat PGE Skra Bełchatów in the final (3–0) and won the Polish Cup for the second time in club history.

Final four
 Venue: Hala Stulecia, Wrocław
 All times are Central European Time (UTC+01:00).

Semifinals
|}

Final

|}

Final standings

Awards

Most Valuable Player	
  Damian Schulz (Trefl Gdańsk)
Best Server
  Piotr Nowakowski (Trefl Gdańsk)
Best Receiver	
  Mateusz Mika (Trefl Gdańsk)
Best Defender
  Fabian Majcherski (Trefl Gdańsk)
	
Best Blocker	
  Srećko Lisinac (PGE Skra Bełchatów)
Best Opposite
  Artur Szalpuk (Trefl Gdańsk)
Best Setter
  Marcin Janusz (PGE Skra Bełchatów)

See also
 2017–18 PlusLiga

References

External links
 Official website

Polish Cup
Polish Cup
Polish Cup
Polish Cup